Freeways is a simulation video game developed and published by Canadian studio Captain Games. It was released for mobile in September 2017 and for Steam on 1 October 2017.

Gameplay 
Freeways simulates real-world traffic management. On each level the player is faced with dead-end roads that need to be connected to each other. The player must create roads and bridges by dragging across the screen to join these up in order to complete the level. If the cars get gridlocked, the word "Jammed!" pops up on the screen and the player must restart the level. Vehicle pathfinding in Freeways is not very advanced, leading to situations where the cars may take alternate routes to what the player intended.

At the end of each level, the level's "efficiency" is calculated from the flow of traffic, the amount of concrete used to make the roads, and the complexity of the system, with a higher score indicating a better-designed road network. The player has nine levels to start off with and more levels (up to 80) are unlocked as the game continues.

Reception 
The game's art style was compared to something from the Atari 2600 and was praised for its "rough-and-ready crudeness". The game has been compared to Cities: Skylines and Mini Metro.

References

External links
 

2017 video games
Android (operating system) games
IOS games
MacOS games
Simulation video games
Video games developed in Canada
Windows games